Simaxis (or  ) is a comune (municipality) in the Province of Oristano in the Italian region Sardinia, located about  northwest of Cagliari and about  northeast of Oristano.  

Simaxis borders the following municipalities: Ollastra, Oristano, Siamanna, Siapiccia, Solarussa, Zerfaliu.

References

External links
Official website

Cities and towns in Sardinia